The Asquith was a short-lived English automobile manufactured by William Asquith at his Halifax machine tool works from 1901 to 1902. The car originally had a front-mounted De Dion engine and belt-drive; this last was later replaced by a two-speed gearbox because the belts kept slipping disastrously.  Probably only one example of the car was built before the firm decided to concentrate on the production of boring machinery.

See also
 List of car manufacturers of the United Kingdom

External links
 http://www.gracesguide.co.uk/William_Asquith

Veteran vehicles
Companies based in Halifax, West Yorkshire
Defunct motor vehicle manufacturers of England